{{Speciesbox
| image = Sphex argentatus fumosus、Homorocoryphus lineosus、9099564、クロアナバチがクサキリを捕獲.JPG
| image_caption = R. lineosa parasitised by the wasp Sphex argentatus
| genus = Ruspolia
| species = lineosa
| authority = (Walker, 1869)
| display_parents = 4
| synonyms = * Conocephalus fuscipes (Redtenbacher, 1891)
 Conocephalus latipennis (Walker, 1869)
}}Ruspolia lineosa'' is an insect which belongs to the family Tettigoniidae (bush crickets or katydids) and found in eastern Asia (Sri Lanka, Indo-China to Japan). The scientific name of this species was first published by Walker in 1869.

References

lineosa
Insects described in 1869
Orthoptera of Indo-China